Hoseynabad-e Kalpu (also Romanized as Ḩoseynābād-e Kālpū; also known as Ḩoseynābād) is a village in Rezvan Rural District, Kalpush District, Meyami County, Semnan Province, Iran. At the 2006 census, its population was 3,242, in 734 families.

References 

Populated places in Meyami County